Metalik Ada (literally "Metallic Island") is a Turkish island. It is part of the Foça Islands group in the Aegean Sea.

Islands of Turkey
Islands of İzmir Province
Gulf of İzmir